Clive Hugh Austin Collins, MBE (6 February 1942 – 21 April 2022) was a British cartoonist and illustrator, who contributed drawings to many publications including The Oldie, Playboy, Punch, Reader's Digest, The Sun (where he also doubled as the racing tipster 'Lucky Jim'), and The Daily Mail. He was the secretary of the British Cartoonists' Association and the Life Vice-President of The Cartoonists' Club of Great Britain. In 2012, he was made a Member of the Order of the British Empire. He was awarded the Cartoonist of the Year award by the Cartoonist Club of Great Britain in 1984, 1985 and 1987. In 1985 Collins was named The Cartoonist of the Year at The International Pavilion of Humor of Montreal, Canada, whose director was Robert LaPalme.

Collins was the brother of musician Phil Collins, and the uncle of actresses Lily Collins and Joely Collins and musician Simon Collins. He died on 21 April 2022, at the age of 80.

References

External links
  (Webarchive)

1942 births
2022 deaths
English cartoonists
Members of the Order of the British Empire
People from Weston-super-Mare
Punch (magazine) cartoonists